Chermayeff & Geismar & Haviv (formerly Brownjohn, Chermayeff & Geismar and Chermayeff & Geismar) is a New York-based branding and graphic design firm. It is currently led by partners Tom Geismar and Sagi Haviv.

About 
It was founded in 1957 by the two Yale graduates Ivan Chermayeff and Tom Geismar as well as Robert Brownjohn, a protégé of László Moholy-Nagy and Chermayeff's father, industrial designer Serge Chermayeff, at the New Bauhaus in Chicago. Brownjohn, who struggled with heroin addiction for most of his adult life, left the partnership to join J. Walter Thompson's London branch in 1959.

The firm has designed logos for such companies as Pan Am, Mobil Oil, PBS, Chase Bank, Barneys New York, The Museum of Modern Art, Xerox, Smithsonian Institution, NBC, Cornell University, National Geographic, State Farm, and many others. Ivan Chermayeff and Tom Geismar were awarded the AIGA Medal in 1979. Chermayeff died on December 3, 2017 at the age of 85.

Between 1976 and 2005 Steff Geissbuhler also joined as a partner. In 2006, designer Sagi Haviv became the third partner at the firm. In 2013 Haviv's name was added to the masthead and the firm became known as Chermayeff & Geismar & Haviv. Designer Mackey Saturday joined the firm as a principal in 2016.

In recent years, the firm created identities for Warner Bros. Discovery, Inc., Discovery, Inc.'s online streaming service Discovery+,
the United States Olympic & Paralympic Museum, the US Open tennis tournament, the Culinary Institute of America, tech and electric car company Togg, fintech company Network Capital, esports brand Panda Global, Dick Wolf’s Wolf Entertainment, Animal Planet, Impossible Aerospace, Hearst Corporation, the Southern Poverty Law Center, The John D. and Catherine T. MacArthur Foundation, Conservation International, the Women's Tennis Association, Harvard University Press, State Farm, Grupo Imagen TV (Mexico), L.A. Reid's Hitco Entertainment, Leonard Bernstein at 100, CourseHero, ClearMotion, Nanotronics, Flatiron Health and other major institutions.

The firm is known for the exhibits and environmental art installations it has designed, including the Ellis Island Immigration Museum, the Statue of Liberty Museum, two World's Fair pavilions (the U.S. pavilions of 1967 and 1970), and the red number 9 at 9 West 57th Street in New York City. In 2008, the new Star-Spangled Banner exhibit designed by the firm opened at the Smithsonian National Museum of American History in Washington, D.C. The firm also designed the Kennedy Center Honors medal,
and designs motion graphics, such as the titles for the Emmy Award-winning PBS documentary series Carrier and in 2009, a motion graphics display for Alicia Keys’ annual fundraiser for her Keep a Child Alive Foundation.

Recently Published Books
In 2018 Ivan Chermayeff, Tom Geismar and Sagi Haviv co-authored Identity: Chermayeff & Geismar & Haviv. The book was published by Standards Manual.

In 2011 Ivan Chermayeff, Tom Geismar and Sagi Haviv co-authored the book Identify: Basic Principles of Identity Design in the Iconic Trademarks of Chermayeff & Geismar. The book was published by Print magazine's book imprint,.

National Design Award

In October 2014 the National Design Award for Lifetime Achievement was awarded to Tom Geismar and Ivan Chermayeff by the Smithsonian’s Cooper-Hewitt, National Design Museum.

Visual Identities Designed

See also
List of AIGA medalists
Peter Chermayeff LLC

Further reading
Warner Bros. Discovery Gets a Modern New Logo in Fast Co. Design
How Chermayeff & Geismar & Haviv Changed American Design in DesignWeek
Chermayeff & Geismar & Haviv’s striped logo for the US Olympic and Paralympic Museum takes the form of an “abstract flame” on ItsNiceThat.com
How Sagi Haviv collaborates to build iconic brands on Wix Shaping Design
Clio Awards interview with Sagi Haviv
How to Create a Logo That Lasts on Creative Review
Excerpt of Identify in Fast Co. Design
How To Design A Logo by Sagi Haviv in Bloomberg Businessweek How To Issue, 2012
What A Campaign Logo Is Really Saying in Bloomberg Politics
Sagi Haviv interviewed in Campaign Logos in Review, NBC
Interview with Haviv on Bloomberg Businessweek
How To Create An Iconic Trademark, Salon Magazine
Still a Good Neighbor State Farm Updates Its Logo New York Times
New York Times announcing Sagi Haviv's name being added to the firm's masthead
Chermayeff & Geismar Collection in the Milton Glaser Design Study Center and Archives
New York Times Profile
New York Times Feature
New York Times Book Review of TM: Trademarks Designed by Chermayeff & Geismar (Princeton Architectural Press. 2001)
New York Times piece on Lincoln Center logo
Chermayeff and Geismar Recognition 1979 AIGA Medal
LogoDesignLove Profile
Logomotion
Interview with Sagi Haviv

External links
Chermayeff & Geismar & Haviv official website

Sources 

Brand valuation
Branding companies of the United States
Companies based in New York City
Graphic design studios
Logo designers
American companies established in 1957
1957 establishments in New York (state)